The  are a series of earth mounds constructed in the early Edo period to mark the border between the feudal domains of Morioka Domain (i.e. “Nanbu territory”) and Sendai Domain (i.e. i.e. “Date territory”) in Mutsu Province of northern Japan. Such boundary markers were common under the Tokugawa shogunate which ruled from 1602 to 1865; however, the number of markers and their excellent state of preservation led the grouping in the modern municipalities of Kitakami and Kanegasaki in Iwate Prefecture to be designated a National Historic Site. on January 31, 2000.

Background
In the year 1642, the Tokugawa shogunate re-confirmed the Nanbu clan and the Date clan in their holdings, and drew a  boundary between the two feudal domains from Mount Komagatake in the Ōu Mountains in the west to the Pacific Ocean in the east. The boundary was defined physically by having a series of large earth mounds erected as boundary markers. In 1688, an additional series of smaller mounds was built to further delineate the boundary. In the 11 kilometer stretch currently designated as a National Historic Site, 17 large mounds and 198 small mounds are preserved.

The protected area is currently maintained as part of the  “Michinoku Folk Village”  open-air museum and is a two minute walk from JR East Kitakami Station.

See also
List of Historic Sites of Japan (Iwate)

References

External links
Iwate prefectural site 
 Kitakami tourist information site 
Glossary of Iwate's Cultural information

Kitakami, Iwate
Kanegasaki, Iwate
Edo period
History of Iwate Prefecture
Historic Sites of Japan
Mutsu Province